André Vandernoot (born 2 June 1927, Brussels; died 6 November 1991, Brussels) was a Belgian conductor.  He studied at the Royal Music Conservatory in Brussels, and later flute and conducting at the Hochschule für Musik, Vienna.  In 1951, he was a prize-winner in a conducting competition in Besançon, France.

From 1959 to 1973, Vandernoot was conductor and artistic director of La Monnaie.  For the 1974-1975 season, he was artistic director of the Belgian National Orchestra.  From 1975 to 1983, he was chief conductor of deFilharmonie (Antwerp), which is now called Antwerp Symphony Orchestra.  He was also director of the Noord Philharmonic Orchestra (Haarlem) from 1978 to 1979.  From 1979 to 1989, he was chief conductor of the Symphony Orchestra of the RTBF in Brussels.  During the 1980s, he worked as artistic director and permanent conductor of Het Brabants Orkest (Tilburg).

He was married to Yugoslavian ballerina Dušanka Sifnios and they had two children: daughter Alexandra Vandernoot, an actress, and son, Patrick Vandernoot, golf instructor.

External links
Short biography

Belgian conductors (music)
Male conductors (music)
Musicians from Brussels
1927 births
1991 deaths
20th-century conductors (music)
20th-century Belgian male musicians